Story for a Black Night is a 1982 family drama novel by Robert Locke, under the pseudonym Clayton Bess, set in Africa. It won the 2002 Phoenix Award Honor Book award.

Plot
A 40-year-old man tells a story of his childhood, when he was ten, living with his sister, mother and grandmother.  When strangers left a baby with smallpox at the house, the family is affected by the disease.

Reception
The book was included in the University of Chicago's Center for Children's Books' volume "The Best in Children's Books:
The University of Chicago Guide to Children's Literature, 1979-1984", which called it "a stunning first novel", "taut and tender, deftly structured, vivid".

There is also a link to the efforts of Rose-Marie Vassallo-Villaneau in her two translations into French. After the English version won the Phoenix Honor Award in 2002 for a book that has endured, she decided that she wanted to do a second translation, this time attempting her own French West African dialect.

Awards
 1982 California Book Awards - (silver) First Novel
 “A Contribution of Cultural Significance” - the Southern California Council on Literature for Children and Young People
 Family Circle - Best Book for Kids
 2002 Phoenix Award Honor Book

Play
Also from this main page is a link to the 2014 one-act play "PURE HEART in Black of Night" with the author now using his playwright's name Robert Locke.

References

External links

Author website

1982 novels